Richard D. Blacknall House is a historic home located at Durham, Durham County, North Carolina.  It was built about 1889, and is a -story, Queen Anne style brick dwelling. The house features an intricate multi-planed roof and a wraparound hip roof porch.  It originally stood at the southwest corner of Erwin Road and Anderson street, and was moved to its present location in 1985.

It was listed on the National Register of Historic Places in 1990.

References

Houses on the National Register of Historic Places in North Carolina
Queen Anne architecture in North Carolina
Houses completed in 1889
Houses in Durham, North Carolina
National Register of Historic Places in Durham County, North Carolina